Pingshan is a town in and the seat of Pingshan County, in southwestern Hebei province, China. , it has 63 villages under its administration.

See also
List of township-level divisions of Hebei

References

Township-level divisions of Hebei
Pingshan County, Hebei